Champaign is an American R&B band, best known for their 1981 hit, "How 'Bout Us".

Career
The septet, who named themselves after their hometown of Champaign, Illinois, United States, included Pauli Carman and Rena Jones (later Day) on vocals; Michael Day and Dana Walden on keyboards; Leon Reeder on guitar; Michael Reed on bass; and Rocky Maffit on percussion/drums. The title track from their 1981 debut album, "How 'Bout Us," was a hit single, reaching No. 5 in the UK Singles Chart, No. 4 on the US Billboard R&B chart, and No. 12 on the Billboard Hot 100. Reed had left the group by the release of their second album, Modern Heart, which appeared in 1983 and contained the No. 2 R&B hit "Try Again" (No. 23 on the Hot 100). Another follow-up, 1984's Woman in Flames, included the Top 10 R&B song "Off and On Love". Other songs include "Party People" and "Walkin'".

Carman released his first solo album, Dial My Number in 1986. The title track was an R&B hit, peaking at No. 26. His second album, It's Time was released the following year. It featured the single "In the Heat of the Night", which peaked at No. 72 on the R&B charts.

Rena Jones and Michael Day eventually married.

In 1990, Champaign (including Carman) reconvened to record, and the Champaign IV album was released the following year. In addition to Carman, the album featured contributions/production from Michael Lane (MicoWave), Rena and Michael Day, Dana Walden, and Rocky Maffit. Although the album was not widely successful, it did herald a brief return to the US R&B chart, with the single, "Trials of the Heart".

Former band member Michael Day died of cancer on June 7, 2001.

In 2003, a greatest hits compilation album was released and included most of the group's hits, though several (most notably "Try Again") were absent.

By 2008, Pauli Carman, the original lead singer, continued to represent the group. The Carma album, released in 2008, included original songs along with a remake of The Beatles' "And I Love Her" and the Stevie Wonder track "I Love, I Love." In 2010, Get Back 2 Love was released (included a remaster of "How 'Bout Us"). The title track "Get Back 2 Love" made reference to Champaign's top hits. The same year, the single "Mercy" was released (a remake of the Marvin Gaye hit "Mercy Mercy Me"). This single was to assist those affected by the oil spill in the Gulf of Mexico. A portion of the proceeds was donated to various agencies assisting with the clean up and restoration in the area.

In November 2010, Carman produced The Pauli Carman Show (a television pilot online show). In 2011, the single "Share" was released. In 2013, the CD album Love Kind was released.

On September 15, 2013, Pauli Carman was presented the National R&B Music Society 'Unsung Hero Award'.

In 2014, the album Eyes of the Spirit was released.

In 2022, the singles "When Your Heart Beats with Mine" and "Can't Let You Go" were released.

Discography

Studio albums

Singles

Compilation albums
2003: Greatest Hits

References

External links
 Champaign — official website
 
 

American contemporary R&B musical groups
Musical groups from Illinois
Musical groups from Champaign, Illinois
Champaign, Illinois
Musical groups established in 1981